The S40 is a regional railway line of the S-Bahn Zürich on the Zürcher Verkehrsverbund (ZVV), Zürich transportation network, in the cantons of  Schwyz, St. Gallen and Zürich.

Route 
 

The line runs from Einsiedeln (SZ) and heads, crossing the Seedamm, for Rapperswil (SG); it is operated by the Südostbahn (SOB).

Stations 
 Einsiedeln
 Biberbrugg
 Schindellegi-Feusisberg
 Samstagern
 Riedmatt
 Wollerau
 Wilen bei Wollerau
 Freienbach SOB
 Pfäffikon SZ
 Hurden
 Rapperswil

Rolling stock 
All services use Südostbahn rolling stock.

Scheduling 
The train frequency is usually 30 minutes, and the trip takes 37 minutes.

See also 

 Rail transport in Switzerland
 Trams in Zürich

References 

 ZVV official website: Routes & zones

Zürich S-Bahn lines
Transport in the canton of St. Gallen
Transport in the canton of Zürich
Canton of Schwyz